Lasioglossum smeathmanellum is a Palearctic species of sweat bee.

References

External links
Images representing  Lasioglossum smeathmanellum

Hymenoptera of Europe
smeathmanellum
Insects described in 1802